The following is a list of episodes for The Aquabats! Super Show!, an American action-comedy television series which aired on the United States cable network The Hub. The 1st season premiered on March 3, 2012 and finished on June 16, 2012 following a run of 13 episodes. The series' 2nd season began airing on June 1, 2013 and concluded on June 29 following a brief run of 5 episodes, while 3 half-hour "specials" aired on December 21 and 28, 2013, and on January 18, 2014. In July 2014, The Aquabats revealed that The Hub had opted not to renew Super Show! for a 3rd season, effectively cancelling the series.

The synopses below summarize the main live-action storyline for each episode. If applicable, also included in each capsule synopsis are brief summaries of the episode's animated segments - annotated by the title A Cartoon!, which may or may not consist of the Lil' Bat shorts - and parody commercials, labeled as Commercial. The list of Songs includes all songs either performed by The Aquabats or a similarly significant character but excludes score and incidental music, otherwise mentioned under Song Notes.

Series overview

Episodes

Pilot (2008)

Season 1 (2012)
In the series' 1st season, the A Cartoon! segments hosted 13 animated shorts featuring The Aquabats in a serialized adventure, with each ending in a cliffhanger resolved in the following episode. The Lil' Bat segments were presented without introductions, typically after a (network) commercial break.

Season 2 (2013–2014)
Season 2 did not feature the serialized A Cartoon! segments of the previous season, instead featuring uniquely animated flashback sequences in the first 5 episodes. Starting with the season's 2nd episode, the A Cartoon! segments were used to introduce the Lil' Bat cartoons featured in every episode.

Mini-episodes (2018–present)
In July 2018, following the launch of The Aquabats' Kickstarter campaign to help finance the return of The Aquabats! Super Show!, the band began releasing "mini-episodes" exclusively to their YouTube channel, both as means to promote the campaign as well as to serve as a continuation of the original series' canon.

The Aquabats! Saturday Morning! (2018)

The Aquabats! RadVentures! (2019–present)

References

Lists of American comedy television series episodes
Episodes